City of Adelaide is the local government area of the Adelaide metropolitan area in South Australia. It includes the municipal authority that runs the City of Adelaide, formerly Adelaide City Council.

City of Adelaide may also refer to:

Places
 Adelaide, a city in South Australia (covers the greater Adelaide area)
 Adelaide city centre, the innermost locality of greater Adelaide

Ships
 , several steamships
 City of Adelaide (1838), a sailing ship
 City of Adelaide (1864), a clipper ship

See also
 Adelaide (disambiguation)

Adelaide, City of